Mount Arafat, and by its other Arabic name, , is a granodiorite hill about  southeast of Mecca, in the province of the same name in Saudi Arabia.

Some Muslims also believe that Mount Arafat is the place where Adam and Eve (Hawa) reunited on Earth after falling from Heaven, believing the mountain to be the place where they were forgiven, hence giving it the name , meaning "Mountain of Mercy". A pillar is erected on top of the mountain to show where this event is believed to have taken place.

The mountain is especially important during the Hajj, with the 9th day of the Islamic month of Dhu al-Hijjah, also known as the Day of 'Arafah after the mountain itself, being the day when Hajj pilgrims leave Mina for Arafat; this day is considered to be the most important day of the Hajj. The pilgrims spend the whole day on the mountain invoking Allah to forgive their sins.

Geology and radiology 
A 2012 study classified Mount Arafat as a granodiorite rock which mainly consists of feldspar, quartz and muscovite, among other minerals. Using petrographic, fission track dating and γ-spectrometric (HPGe) techniques in order to study the geology, thermal history and the radiological hazards due to the presence of primordial radionuclides.

The study yielded fission track age of 9.13 ± 1.05 Ma of the Mount Arafat granodiorite. In addition, the study reported that rifting, magmatism, volcanism and seafloor spreading that resulted in the formation of Red Sea seems to have altered the original age of the Arafat granodiorite under study to 9.13 ± 1.05 Ma. Measured radioactivity concentrations due to Ra, Th and K were found to not pose any radiological health hazard to the general public.

Hajj 
Arafat rituals end at sunset and pilgrims then move to Muzdalifah for Maghrib prayer and a shortened Isha prayer and for a short rest.

The level area surrounding the hill is called the Plain of Arafat. The term Mount Arafat is sometimes applied to this entire area. It is an important place in Islam because, during the Hajj, pilgrims spend the afternoon there on the ninth day of Dhu al-Hijjah. Failure to be present in the plain of Arafat on the required day invalidates the pilgrimage.

Since late 2010, this place is served by Mecca Metro.

In literature 
The hill is referenced in James Joyce's novel Finnegans Wake.

See also 

 Du'a Arafah
 Sarat Mountains

References

External links 
 
 Muslim pilgrims gather at Mount Arafat for Hajj's key moment (YouTube)
 Muslim pilgrims scale Mount Arafat for peak of hajj
 Millions Of Muslim Pilgrims Gather At Mount Arafat To Mark Pinnacle Of Hajj | TIME
 اكثر من 2 مليون حاج يصعدون إلى جبل عرفات 1433 هـ (in Arabic)

Arafat
Geography of Mecca
Hajj